Miao Min (born 28 April 1960) is a Chinese speed skater. She competed in two events at the 1984 Winter Olympics.

References

1960 births
Living people
Chinese female speed skaters
Olympic speed skaters of China
Speed skaters at the 1984 Winter Olympics
Sportspeople from Heilongjiang